William Bassett may refer to:

William Bassett (by 1531-52 or later), MP for Maldon
William Bassett (died 1553), MP for Derbyshire
William Bassett (died 1586) (1507–1586), MP for Glamorgan
William Bassett (died 1601), MP for Staffordshire
William Bassett (Royalist) (died 1656), MP for Bath
William Bassett (died 1693) (1628–1693), MP for Bath
William Bassett (actor) (born 1935), American actor
William Bassett (d. 1667), early American colonist
William Bassett, Jr. (1624–1703), whose daughter Elizabeth Proctor was accused of witchcraft in the 1692 Salem witch trials

William Bassett (USAF officer), a USAF officer who, contrary to a received order, decided not to launch missiles armed with nuclear warheads while stationed at Okinawa during the 1962 Cuban Missile Crisis

See also
William Basset (disambiguation)
Billy Bassett (1869–1937), English footballer, director and club chairman for West Bromwich Albion 
Billy Bassett (Welsh footballer) (1912–1977)